Carlo Ferrara is a luxury Italian watch brand, which is known for collection of timepieces named "Regolatore", which feature hour and minute hands on independent vertical elliptical tracks. The timepieces are manufactured in Italy.

References

Watch brands
Watch manufacturing companies of Italy